The wear coefficient is a physical coefficient used to measure, characterize and correlate the wear of materials.

Background
Traditionally, the wear of materials has been characterized by weight loss and wear rate. However, studies have found that wear coefficient is more suitable. The reason being that it takes the wear rate, the applied load, and the hardness of the wear pin into account. Although, measurement variations by an order of 10-1 have been observed, the variations can be minimized if suitable precautions are taken.

A wear volume versus distance curve can be divided into at least two regimes, the transient wear regime and the steady-state wear regime. The volume or weight loss is initially curvilinear. The wear rate per unit sliding distance in the transient wear regime decreases until it has reached a constant value in the steady-state wear regime. Hence the standard wear coefficient value obtained from a volume loss versus distance curve is a function of the sliding distance.

Measurement

The steady-state wear equation was proposed as:

 is the dimensionless standard wear coefficient.

Therefore, the wear coefficient  in the abrasive model is defined as:

As  can be estimated from weight loss  and the density , the wear coefficient can also be expressed as:

As the standard method uses the total volume loss and the total sliding distance, there is a need to define the net steady-state wear coefficient:

With regard to the sliding wear model K can be expressed as:

where  is the plastically deformed zone.

If the coefficient of friction is defined as:

where  is the tangential force. 
Then K can be defined for abrasive wear as work done to create abrasive wear particles by cutting  to external work done :

In an experimental situation the hardness of the uppermost layer of material in the contact may not be known with any certainty, consequently, the ratio  is more useful; this is known as the dimensional wear coefficient or the specific wear rate. This is usually quoted in units of mm3 N−1 m−1.

Composite material
As metal matrix composite (MMC) materials have become to be used more often due to their better physical, mechanical and tribological properties compared to matrix materials it is necessary to adjust the equation.

The proposed equation is:

where  is a function of the average particle diameter ,  is the volume fraction of particles.

Therefore, the effects of load and pin hardness can be shown:

As wear testing is a time-consuming process, it was shown to be possible to save time by using a predictable method.

See also
 wear rate
 weight loss

References

Notes

Further reading
 Nam P. Suh, Tribophysics, Prentice-Hall, 1986,

External links

Materials science

Materials science
Materials degradation
Building engineering